Heartbreakin Man is an EP from the Louisville indie rock band My Morning Jacket. It was released in May 2000 by Darla Records; it was made available as a free iTunes download in 2004.

Critical reception
The Village Voice panned the EP, describing it as "six wet noodles." Rolling Stone deemed the title track "dreamy R.E.M.-like jangle."

Track listing
 Heartbreakin Man – 3:11
 Old Sept. Blues (ga-ed out version) – 5:43
 They Ran (acoustic) – 3:32
 Evelyn Is Not Real (be-mixed) – 2:30
 R.I.P.V.G. – 2:19
 Tonite I Want To Celebrate With You – 2:26

Notes
 Track 1 taken from "The Tennessee Fire"
 Track 2 taken from "LoladaMusica" (Recorded live in the Netherlands, January 2000)
 Track 3 taken from "Zondagskint" (Radio 3FM – the Netherlands, April 9, 2000)
 Tracks 4–6 taken from the bonus 7" single, included with first vinyl pressings of "The Tennessee Fire"

References

My Morning Jacket EPs
2000 EPs
Darla Records EPs
Albums produced by Jim James